Kue lapis is an Indonesian , or a traditional snack of steamed colourful layered soft rice flour pudding. In Indonesian  means "layers". This steamed layered sticky rice cake or pudding is quite popular in Indonesia, Suriname (where it is simply known as lapis) and can also be found in the Netherlands through their colonial links. Kue lapis is also very popular in neighbouring Malaysia, Singapore, and Brunei where it is called . Kue lapis was introduced by the Sino-Burmese to Lower Myanmar, where it is known as kway lapay or kway lapaysa.

Ingredients and cooking method
This snack usually consists of two alternating coloured layers, thus the name of the cake. The cake is made of rice flour, sago, coconut milk, sugar, salt, and food colouring. Popular food colouring includes green-coloured pandan and red frozen food colouring. It is common to find rainbow layered kue too. This cake is steamed gradually, and layers are subsequently added in alternating order to avoid different colours mixing together. This method will create layered pudding-cake. Kue Lapis has bouncy gelatin-like texture, yet unlike jelly this cake is quite sticky and chewy due to rice pudding content.

Kue lapis is similar to lapis legit or spekkoek, the difference being that lapis legit is a puffy layered cake, made of flour and is baked, while kue lapis is a moist layered pudding, made of rice flour and sago, and is steamed.

See also

 Lapis legit
 Sapin-sapin, a similar Filipino dessert
 Khanom chan, a similar Thai kue dessert
 List of steamed foods

References

External links
 Kue Lapis, steamed layered cake recipe
 Kue Lapis Recipe
 Rainbow Kue Lapis Recipe

Kue
Malaysian snack foods
Singaporean snack foods
Singaporean cuisine
Steamed foods
Burmese cuisine